Chiabol may refer to:

 Cheyabel
 Sharaf Bag